Trąbki Wielkie  is a village in Gdańsk County, Pomeranian Voivodeship, in northern Poland. It is the seat of the gmina (administrative district) called Gmina Trąbki Wielkie. It is located within the historic region of Pomerania.

The village has a population of 1,240.

Trąbki Wielkie was a royal village of the Polish Crown, administratively located in the Tczew County in the Pomeranian Voivodeship.

References

Villages in Gdańsk County